Clifton Leland "Cliff" Corker (born 1967) is a United States district judge of the United States District Court for the Eastern District of Tennessee.

Education 

Corker received his Bachelor of Business Administration from James Madison University and his Juris Doctor from William & Mary Law School.

Legal career 

After graduating from law school, Corker clerked for then-Magistrate Judge Cynthia D. Kinser of the United States District Court for the Western District of Virginia. From 1994 to 1995, he was a volunteer with the Federal Public Defender's office in Greeneville. He then spent a year at Terry, Terry & Stapleton. From 1996 to 2015, Corker had a solo practice in Johnson City, before becoming a magistrate judge. There, he handled matters including complex civil litigation and capital murder cases.

Federal judicial service

Magistrate judge tenure 

On April 30, 2015, Corker was appointed a United States magistrate judge of the United States District Court for the Eastern District of Tennessee. His service as a magistrate judge terminated upon appointment to the district court.

Nomination to district court 

On October 10, 2018, President Donald Trump announced his intent to nominate Corker to serve as a United States District Judge of the United States District Court for the Eastern District of Tennessee. On November 13, 2018, his nomination was sent to the Senate. President Trump nominated Corker to the seat vacated by Judge J. Ronnie Greer, who assumed  senior status on June 30, 2018. On November 28, 2018, a hearing on his nomination was held before the Senate Judiciary Committee.

On January 3, 2019, his nomination was returned to the President under Rule XXXI, Paragraph 6 of the United States Senate. On January 23, 2019, President Trump announced his intent to renominate Corker for a federal judgeship. His nomination was sent to the Senate later that day. On February 7, 2019, his nomination was reported out of committee by a 12–10 vote. On July 17, 2019, the Senate voted 55–41 to invoke cloture on his nomination. On July 18, 2019, his nomination was confirmed by a 55–39 vote. He received his judicial commission on July 22, 2019.

Personal life 
Corker is unrelated to former U.S. Senator from Tennessee Bob Corker.

References

External links 
 
 

1967 births
Living people
20th-century American lawyers
21st-century American lawyers
21st-century American judges
James Madison University alumni
Judges of the United States District Court for the Eastern District of Tennessee
Lawyers from Richmond, Virginia
Tennessee lawyers
United States district court judges appointed by Donald Trump
United States magistrate judges
William & Mary Law School alumni